Naked Capitalism is an American financial news and analysis blog that "chronicles the large scale, concerted campaign to reduce the bargaining power and pay of ordinary workers relative to investors and elite technocrats".

Susan Webber, the principal of Aurora Advisors Incorporated – a management-consulting firm based in New York City – and author of ECONned, using the pen name Yves Smith, launched the site in December 2006. She focused on finance and economic news and analysis, with an emphasis on legal and ethical issues of the banking industry and the mortgage foreclosure process, the worldwide effects of the banking crisis of 2008, the 2007–2012 global financial crisis, and its aftermath.

The site has had over 60 million visitors since 2007, and was cited as among CNBC's 2012 top 25 "Best Alternative Financial Blogs", calling Smith "a harsh critic of Wall Street who believes that fraud was at the center of the financial crisis".

Background
Webber graduated from Harvard College and Harvard Business School. She had 20 years of experience in the financial services industry with  Goldman Sachs, McKinsey & Co., and Sumitomo Bank. She has written articles for the New York Times, Bloomberg, and the Roosevelt Institute. In 2006, Webber started writing because,

Reporting
Naked Capitalism features a daily Links article linking to timely articles and analysis from other websites. Starting in 2014, the popularity of the daily Links article caused a daily 2:00 PM Water Cooler article to be introduced to link to same-day news to make publishing the daily Links easier by reducing the number of links.

The daily Links also features an Antidote du Jour, normally a picture of an animal. The 2:00 PM Water Cooler features plant images.

Impact
The New York Times financial reporter Gretchen Morgenson cited Naked Capitalism as one of the "must-read financial blogs" she read regularly. Since 2010, Yves Smith has been a repeat guest on Le Show hosted by Harry Shearer. In 2013, Naked Capitalism released an e-book titled "Naked Capitalism Whistleblower Report on Bank of America Foreclosure Reviews".

Contributing writers
Naked Capitalism features Yves Smith's contributions and articles and analysis from the following current major contributors:

 David Dayen, who also contributes news and analysis to the political blog Firedoglake.
 Edward Harrison, founder of Credit Writedowns, a financial blog.
 Philip Pilkington, blogger at Fixing the Economists and a contributing writer for The Guardian.
 Matt Stoller, fellow at the Open Markets Institute
 Richard Smith
 Nathan Tankus
 Lambert Strether, blogger at Corrente Wire.

References

External links
Aurora Advisors Inc. bio for Susan Webber
Naked Capitalism entries on the Daily Kos blog

American financial news websites
Financial news agencies
News agencies based in the United States